The 1994 Massachusetts gubernatorial election was held on November 8, 1994. Incumbent Republican Governor Bill Weld won reelection as Governor of Massachusetts by the largest margin in state history. As of 2022, this is the most recent election in which Boston, Somerville, Lawrence, Chelsea, Brookline, Northampton, Provincetown, Monterey, Great Barrington, Ashfield, Williamstown, Williamsburg, Shelburne, Sunderland, and Pelham voted for the Republican candidate for governor.

Republican primary

Governor

Candidates
Bill Weld, incumbent Governor

Lieutenant Governor

Candidates
Paul Cellucci, incumbent Lieutenant Governor

Incumbent Governor Bill Weld and Lieutenant Governor Paul Cellucci were unopposed for renomination.

Democratic primary

Governor

Candidates
George A. Bachrach, former State Senator from Watertown
Michael J. Barrett, State Senator from Cambridge
Mark Roosevelt, State Representative from the Back Bay and member of the Roosevelt family

In 1987, Barrett succeeded Bachrach as the Senator from the Middlesex and Suffolk District. The district was composed of Cambridge, Belmont, Watertown, and the Allston-Brighton neighborhood of Boston.

Results

Lieutenant Governor

Candidates
Bob Massie, activist
Marc Draisen, State Representative from Roslindale

Results

General election

Polling

Results
Governor Weld defeated Democrat Mark Roosevelt by a 71%–28% margin, the largest gubernatorial margin of victory in Massachusetts history. Roosevelt won only six municipalities statewide (Amherst, Cambridge, Leverett, Otis, Shutesbury and Wendell). All six municipalities voted for Weld in 1990, meaning that he won every municipality in the state in a gubernatorial election.

Results by county

Other races
 Republican Joe Malone was re-elected as Treasurer over Democrat Shannon O'Brien.
 William F. Galvin was elected Secretary of the Commonwealth for the first time.

See also
 1993–1994 Massachusetts legislature

References

Massachusetts
Gubernatorial
1994
Bill Weld